"Girl in the Movies" is a song by American singer-songwriter Dolly Parton. It was written by Parton and Linda Perry for the soundtrack of the 2018 Netflix film, Dumplin'. The song was produced by Perry and released as the second single from the soundtrack on November 2, 2018. It was nominated for Best Original Song at the 76th Golden Globe Awards and Best Song Written for Visual Media at the 62nd Annual Grammy Awards.

Critical reception
In a review for Rolling Stone, Stephen L. Betts called the song "a dreamy ballad, both literally and figuratively," praising the song's lyrical structure and its movie theatre metaphors.
Writing for Wide Open Country, Bobbie Jean Sawyer gave a positive review of the song, saying that it is a song "for any daydreamer who's escaped to the movies to wonder what it would be like to shine like your favorite characters on the silver screen."

Music video
The song's music video was released on November 19, 2018. The black and white video depicts Parton playing an acoustic guitar and performing the song with color clips from the film interspersed throughout.

Live performances
Parton performed the song live for the first time on October 22, 2018, accompanied by Perry on guitar, at a luncheon for the Netflix film Dumplin''' at Four Seasons Hotel Los Angeles at Beverly Hills in Los Angeles. On November 30, Parton performed the song on NBC's Today. That evening she appeared on The Tonight Show Starring Jimmy Fallon, where she performed a medley of Christmas songs with Fallon, in addition to being interviewed and performing "Girl in the Movies". Parton also performed the song on The Ellen DeGeneres Show'' on December 6.

Personnel
Adapted from the album liner notes.

Chris Allgood – mastering assiatant
David Angell – violin
Sean Badum – string recording assistant
Avery Bright – viola
Billy Bush – mixing
David Davidson – violin
Luis Flores – assistant engineer
Damon Fox – B3 organ
David Goldstein – drums
Austin Hoke – cello, string arrangements
Emily Lazar – mastering
Briana Lee – background vocals
John McBride – string recording
Billy Mohler – bass
Emily Nelson – cello
Eli Pearl – pedal steel guitar
Linda Perry – acoustic guitar, writer, producer, engineer
Maiya Sykes – background vocals
Kristin Weber – violin
Katelyn Westergard – violin
Kristin Wilkinson – viola

References

2018 singles
2018 songs
Dolly Parton songs
Songs written by Dolly Parton
Songs written by Linda Perry